The Renals Baronetcy, of the City of London, is a title in the Baronetage of the United Kingdom. It was created on 4 September 1895 for Joseph Renals. He was a partner in the firm of Renals & Co, merchants, and served as Lord Mayor of London from 1894 to 1895.

Renals baronets (1895)

Sir Joseph Renals, 1st Baronet (1843–1908)
Sir James Herbert Renals, 2nd Baronet (1870–1927)
Sir Herbert Renals, 3rd Baronet (1919–1961)
Sir Stanley Renals, 4th Baronet (1923–2020)
Sir Stanley Michael Renals, 5th Baronet (born 1958)

The heir apparent is the present holder's son, Lloyd James Renals (born 1985)

References

Kidd, Charles, Williamson, David (editors). Debrett's Peerage and Baronetage (1990 edition). New York: St Martin's Press, 1990.

External links
Short biography of Sir Joseph Renals, 1st Baronet

Renals